The Battle of Makassar Strait, also known as the Action of Madura Strait, the Action North of Lombok Strait and the Battle of the Flores Sea, was a naval battle of the Pacific theater of World War II. An American-British-Dutch-Australian (ABDA) fleet—under Schout-bij-nacht (Rear Admiral) Karel Doorman—was on its way to intercept a Japanese invasion convoy reported as bound for Surabaya (its destination was actually Makassar), when it was attacked by 36 Mitsubishi G4M1 "Betty" and 24 Mitsubishi G3M2 "Nell" medium bombers, which forced the fleet to retreat.

The battle occurred on 4 February 1942 in the Java Sea, closer to the Kangean Islands than to Makassar Strait. This battle should not be confused with the Battle of Balikpapan, which occurred over a week earlier on 24 January 1942, which is also sometimes referred to as the "Battle of Makassar Strait".

Background
At the end of January, Japanese forces had conquered the north and west coast of Borneo and large parts of Maluku (Moluccas). On Borneo's east coast, Japanese forces occupied the oil facilities and ports of Balikpapan and Tarakan, and on Celebes the cities of Menado and Kendari had also fallen. To gain full control of Makassar Strait, the Japanese needed to capture the cities of Makassar and Banjarmasin.

On 1 February, Allied commanders received word from a reconnaissance plane: at Balikpapan, a Japanese invasion force—consisting of 20 troop transport ships, three cruisers and 10 destroyers—was preparing to sail. On 2 February, Admiral Thomas C. Hart, Vice-Admiraal (Vice Admiral) Conrad Helfrich, Rear Admiral William A. Glassford and (Commodore) John Collins, RAN  met at Palembang; Helfrich's suggestion that a strike force be formed was approved. It was formed the following day under Schout-bij-nacht (Rear Admiral) Karel Doorman, and began taking on supplies at the Gili Islands, south of Madura.

Battle
On the morning of 3 February, the ABDA strike force was spotted by a formation of about 30 Japanese bombers reported as heading toward Surabaya. Seven of the bombers showed special interest in the strike force and started circling above the ships. The ships initially dispersed to deeper water, but the planes left without attacking, and the strike force resumed taking on supplies.

At about midnight, the ships sailed for Meinderts Droogte (Meinderts Reef; later Karang Mas), off the north east tip of Java. The last ship arrived around 05:00 on 4 February. At 09:30, the strike force received word that air patrols from Makassar had spotted the Japanese apparently heading for Surabaya. On the morning of 4 February, the ABDA strike force headed out for Makassar Strait, in search of the Japanese invasion force, which was reported to be passing through the straits and was now said to include three cruisers and 18 destroyers, escorting transports and other ships, under Sho-sho (Rear Admiral) Takeo Takagi.

At 09:49, while Doorman's strike force was south of the Kangean Islands, Japanese bombers were sighted to the east by sailors on the ABDA ships.

The planes attacked the Allied cruisers. During a second attack, Marblehead sustained two direct hits and a damaging near miss. The two direct hits penetrated the deck, killed 15 crew directly and destroyed the ship's ability to manoeuver; Marblehead was now able only to sail in circles. The near miss also caused a hole , near the bottom of the ship. However, subsequent attacks on Marblehead were less intense.

Houston initially evaded bombs successfully, but suffered a severe hit during a final attack; a bomb hit the deck near the aft gun turret, and killed 48 crew. The rear guns were rendered useless.

After the hits on Houston and Marblehead, the planes focused on De Ruyter, which evaded four attacks and sustained only minor damage to fire control for its 40 mm guns.

At about 13:00, Doorman ordered his ships to return west and signalled Hart that—without fighter protection—it would not be possible to advance to Makassar Strait, due to the threat from bombers. Houston and Tromp had already gone south through Alas Strait, and were south of the strait. Marblehead and the four U.S. destroyers went south through Lombok Strait. De Ruyter and the three Dutch destroyers also stayed with Marblehead until the Lombok Strait. Both U.S. cruisers headed for Tjilatjap, to get repairs and medical attention for their wounded.

Aftermath
Japanese aircrews reported three cruisers sunk during the attack: one "Augusta class cruiser", one Tromp-class cruiser type and one Java-class cruiser. However, no ships of the latter class were present during the attack, and only Marblehead and Houston were damaged.

At Tjilatjap, Houston and Marblehead transferred their wounded to a hospital and buried their dead. Marblehead would not fit in the dry dock, but the hole in the hull was temporarily repaired, and the ship sailed for the east coast of the U.S.—by way of Ceylon and South Africa—for repairs. Houston was able to continue service with the ABDA fleet.

The retreat of the strike force resulted in the Japanese taking control of Makassar Strait and thereby tightening their grip on the western part of the Dutch East Indies.

Notes

References
Bezemer, K. W. L. Zij Vochten Op De Zeven Zeeën. 5th ed. Utrecht: W. de Haan N.V., 1964. 243–247 

Muir, Dan Order of Battle – Battle of Makassar Strait 1942

 

Makassar Strait
Makasser Strait
Makassar Strait
Makassar Strait
Japanese occupation of the Dutch East Indies
1942 in Japan
1942 in the Dutch East Indies
February 1942 events
Makassar Strait